Chester is a city in Cheshire, England containing over 650 structures that are designated as listed buildings by English Heritage and included in the National Heritage List for England. Of these, over 500 are listed at Grade II, the lowest of the three gradings given to listed buildings and applied to "buildings of national importance and special interest". This list contains the Grade II listed buildings in the central unparished area of the city within Chester city walls or located adjacent to them.

Chester contains listed buildings dating back to the Roman conquest of Britain, when the city was the major fortress in the northwest of England, known as Deva Victrix, and a port on the River Dee. During this time northern section of the city walls was built, and the four main roads, which survive to the present, were created. After the Romans left Britain, the city went into decline, and many of the buildings became ruinous. The city became important again following the Norman conquest and Chester Castle was built. Following this the city walls were extended to the south. As the lowest crossing point on the Rived Dee, it was of strategic importance, particularly in the campaigns against the Welsh. During this time it was also a market town, and there was much domestic building, including the creation of the Chester Rows, where there are two levels of pedestrian walkway, one at street level, and one at a higher level under cover. Chester was involved in the Civil War, when the city was besieged, and many buildings were damaged. Following this, the city prospered and, despite the closing of the port due to silting of the river, there was much building and rebuilding during the 17th and 18th centuries. Initially the new buildings were timber-framed and later they were in local sandstone or brick, and sections of the rows were enclosed and incorporated into some of the buildings. In 1779 the Chester Canal, later part of the Shropshire Union Canal, opened, bringing opportunities for more industry to the city. About this time, and in the earlier part of the 19th century, a number of Neoclassical buildings were erected, and the Grosvenor Bridge was built over the River Dee, providing an alternative road bridge to the medieval and narrow Old Dee Bridge. In the middle of the century there was a reaction against the Georgian and Neoclassical style of architecture, and Chester was at the forefront of the Black-and-white Revival, reintroducing timber-framed buildings into the city. The 20th century brought some Modernist buildings into the city, and later in the century there was a growing interest in conservation, when a number of dilapidated older buildings were repaired and restored.

This list includes structures from all phases of Chester's historical heritage, other than from the Roman era, which are listed in the higher grades. Many of the buildings in the town retain medieval fabric, some in small amounts, and others with more substantial material, mainly in the four main ancient roads. An example is St Nicholas Chapel, which originally dates from around 1300. There are timber-framed buildings, and timber-framed buildings that were later encased in brick. Examples include the Old Custom House Inn, Nine Houses, Ye Olde Edgar and Stanley Palace. A large number of Georgian houses have survived, particularly in King Street and Castle Street, as well in the main roads. Examples include Park House and 10–28 Nicholas Street. There are some examples of Neoclassical buildings, such as Chester City Club. A large number of buildings from the Black-and-white Revival are listed at Grade II. These include The Chester Grosvenor Hotel, 30 and 38 Bridge Street, 3, 11–13, 15–17 and 19 Northgate Street, and St Oswald's Chambers and St Werburgh's Mount on Werburgh Street. A few modern structures have been listed, including the former Odeon Cinema (1936) and Newgate (1937–38). One of the most-recent listed buildings is Addleshaw Tower, a free-standing bell-tower of Chester Cathedral, built in 1973–75 in a Modernist style. Unusual listed structures include a scale model of Grosvenor Bridge, the War Memorial, a Cenotaph to Matthew Henry, a tombstone commemorating the soldier Thomas Gould, a sundial, a birdbath and two telephone kiosks.

List

See also

Grade I listed buildings in Cheshire West and Chester
Grade II* listed buildings in Cheshire West and Chester
Grade II listed buildings in Chester (north and west)
Grade II listed buildings in Chester (east)
Grade II listed buildings in Chester (south)

References
Citations

Sources

 
 

 Central
Cheshire Central